Cybernetica is an Estonian company best known for development of Estonia's e-Estonia X-Road and Internet voting system.
Established in 1997 as Küberneetika AS, it is a successor of the applied research unit of the Institute of Cybernetics of the Academy of Sciences of Estonia, established in 1960.

References

Technology companies of Estonia